Jette or Jetté is a French surname and Scandinavian feminine given name. It may refer to:

As a surname 
 Alphonse Jetté (1887-1944), Canadian hockey player with the Montreal Canadiens
 Louis-Amable Jetté (1836-1920), Canadian lawyer, politician, judge, professor and eighth Lieutenant Governor of Quebec
 Marie-Rosalie Cadron-Jetté or Cadron Jetté (1794-1864), Canadian Catholic nun and founder of the Congregation of the Sisters of Misericorde, declared "Venerable" by Pope Francis in 2013
 Michel Jetté, Canadian/Québécois director, screenwriter, producer and editor

As a given name 
 Jette Andersen (born 1959), Danish footballer
 Jette Baagøe (born 1946), director of the Danish Museum of Hunting and Forestry
 Jette Bang (1914–1964), Danish photographer and filmmaker
 Jette F. Christensen (born 1983), Norwegian politician
Jette Gottlieb (born 1948), Danish politician
 Jette Hansen (born 1953), Danish footballer

See also 

 Jette, municipality in Belgium

Feminine given names
Surnames of French origin